Agnieszka Kotulanka, rightly Agnieszka Sas-Uhrynowska (born Agniesza Kotuła; 26 October 1956 – 20 February 2018) was a Polish actress. She was best known for her long-term role as Krystyna Lubicz in the Polish soap opera Klan (1997–2012).

Personal life
She was born in Warsaw and graduated from XXXIX Liceum Ogólnokształcące im. Lotnictwa Polskiego.

Kotulanka's marriage ended in divorce. She was the mother of two children.

Filmography

References

External links

1956 births
2018 deaths
Polish actresses
Actresses from Warsaw